The 1943–44 Drexel Dragons men's basketball team represented Drexel Institute of Technology during the 1943–44 men's basketball season. The Dragons, led by 1st year head coach John Marino, played their home games at Curtis Hall Gym.

Due to wartime, the Drexel varsity men's basketball team was replaced with the Drexel men's junior varsity (or "frosh") team.  This team is presumed to be the Drexel Dragons men's basketball team for the 1943–44 season for record keeping purposes.  Following the season, it was expected that most, if not all, of the players from this team, including the head coach, would ever return to the team again due to joining the armed forces in World War II. The schedule for the season was essentially made as the season went on, with few games scheduled before the season began.

During the season, a mixed team of civilians and cadets (3318th S.U.) that were stationed on the Drexel University campus formed, called the Drexel ASTU.  The team attempted to form the previous season, however had trouble composing a schedule when they learned they would only be allowed to face teams that were also ASTP teams.  This team was coached by Maury McMains, who was the director of the physical training program for the cadets.  When McMains was unavailable, Gene Carney (A-3) assumed coaching responsibilities as a player-coach.  While the team was at a disadvantage due to a lack of practice, members of the team included former college basketball players and other experienced basketball players.  The Drexel ASTU men left the campus in April after being recalled.

Roster

Drexel J.V. Team

Drexel ASTU

Schedule

Drexel J.V. Team

|-
!colspan=9 style="background:#F8B800; color:#002663;"| Regular season
|-

Drexel ASTU

|-
!colspan=9 style="background:#F8B800; color:#002663;"| Regular season
|-

References

Drexel Dragons men's basketball seasons
Drexel
1943 in sports in Pennsylvania
1944 in sports in Pennsylvania